The Schnäggeninseli (German, lit. "snail island") is an island in Lake Brienz, located in the Bernese Oberland. It is the only island in the lake and among the largest in the Bernese Oberland. The island has a maximum length of 115 metres and a maximum width of 40 metres. Its highest point is 570 metres above sea level or 6 metres above lake level (564 m). The distance from the shore is about 300 metres. The island is private property and belongs to the Schloss Seeburg.

Politically the island belongs to the municipality of Iseltwald in the district of Interlaken-Oberhasli.

References
Swisstopo topographic maps

External links

Lakes of the canton of Bern
Lake islands of Switzerland